John Mulchaey is an American astrophysicist working as the science deputy of the Carnegie Institution for Science and the director and Crawford H. Greenewalt Chair of the Carnegie Observatories, the Institution’s division for astronomy and astrophysics research.

Education 
Mulchaey earned a Bachelor of Science in astrophysics from the University of California, Berkeley and a Ph.D. in astrophysics from the University of Maryland, College Park.

Career 
Mulchaey joined Carnegie as a postdoctoral fellow, after a graduate student fellowship at the Space Telescope Science Institute. At the conclusion of his fellowship, he received a staff scientist appointment. Mulchaey was named director in 2015 after five years as associate director for academic affairs.

Early in his career, Mulchaey led the research group that revolutionized our understanding of galaxy groups by revealing the existence of large amounts of dark matter in their compositions. More recently, he was part of the teams that discovered the first known binary quasar system  and that first watched a fast radio burst in real time.

Mulchaey oversees the Carnegie Observatories' main campus in Pasadena, California, as well as the Las Campanas Observatory in Chile. In this role, he also serves on the board of the next-generation Giant Magellan Telescope, which is under construction at Carnegie's facility in Chile.  

Mulchaey is well regarded for his work on groups and clusters of galaxies—most of which, including our own Milky Way, exist collectively. These systems can be important laboratories for studying the processes that shape galaxies throughout their lifetimes, from their formation through their evolution. 

In addition to his research efforts, Mulchaey is involved in public outreach and educational activities, including the annual Carnegie Observatories Open House and the Astronomy Lecture Series at the Huntington Library. In 2020, he received the Helios Award, part of the international Rotary Humanitarian STAR Awards program, for his achievements in scientific education.

References

American astrophysicists
Living people
Year of birth missing (living people)